The Cox Building is a historic department store building located at 36-48 St. Paul Street in Rochester, Monroe County, New York.

Description and history 
It is a seven-story, red brick and brownstone structure of masonry load bearing construction. It was built in 1888 by architecture firm Sibley, Lindsay & Curr, and is characterized by fine Romanesque style detailing.

It was listed on the National Register of Historic Places on October 11, 1984.

Gallery

See also
 National Register of Historic Places listings in Rochester, New York

References

Commercial buildings in Rochester, New York
Commercial buildings completed in 1888
Commercial buildings on the National Register of Historic Places in New York (state)
Department stores on the National Register of Historic Places
National Register of Historic Places in Rochester, New York